= Japanese Army =

Japanese Army may refer to:

- Imperial Japanese Army, 1868–1945
- Japan Ground Self-Defense Force, 1954–present
